Orlu is the second largest city in South East, Imo State, Nigeria, with a population of 420,600. It has a long history as the headquarters for the Organisation of African Unity (OAU) and humanitarian relief agencies during the Nigeria-Biafra Civil War. The city houses the Nigerian headquarters of the British Cheshire Home. It is the second most developed city after Owerri in Imo state.

Commerce and industries
Orlu is a home for enterprise and industry and is unofficially known as the "commercial capital" of Imo state. Many successful Nigerian businessmen, and industrialists hail from the eleven local government areas that make up the Orlu Senatorial Zone. They include Orsu, Isu, Njaba, Nwangele, Nkwerre, Ideato North, Ideato South, Oru East, Oru West, Ohaji/Egbema and Oguta. The city centres of the local government area are within the host towns of Amaifeke, Ihioma/Ebenese, Umuna, Umuowa, Umutanze, Okporo, Orlu-Gedegwum and Owerre-Ebeiri. When all of the LGAs in the zone are included Orlu's population is estimated to be approaching 3,000,000 inhabitants.

Orlu is the permanent site for various industries including state and federal agencies like the Imo State University Teaching Hospital, the state-owned cardboard industry in Owerri-Ebeiri, the newly built Imo State School of Nursing and Health Technology at Okporo as well as many small and medium size chemical and pharmaceutical companies. The multipurpose Imo International Market which houses one of the three most influential pharmaceutical markets in West Africa is based in Orlu due to the high number of Orlulites in the pharmaceutical and chemical industry. Consequently, the Orlu Zonal Area has the highest concentration of indigenous pharmaceutical manufacturers and marketers in the whole of African continent.

The Ogbosisi Timber Centre is located within the quick expanding Orlu Urban area and the city centre. The Nigeria Immigration Training School (NITS) in Umuowa and the Technological Skills Acquisition Centre (TESAC) are also based in the city.

Cultural festivals

Many towns in Orlu hold cultural masquerade festivals through which they express their communal attributes, descents and heritages. The people of Orlu have made important contributions towards the educational, sports and political growth of Nigeria.

The Orlu community from which the city and entire zone derives its name from comprises 10 villages and is ruled by the Igwe of Orlu. The current Igwe is Eze Dr. Patrick II Chinedu Acholonu.

Notable people
Notable members of the ruling family include Eze Patrick I Ibeakanma Acholonu, the first Senator to represent Orlu/Okigwe division (presently Orlu Zone and Okigwe Zone) in the old Federation of Nigeria as well as the 1st Republic; the late Justice Ignatius Chukwudi Pats Acholonu, the first Orlu indigene to become a Supreme Court justice; Dr. Douglas Acholonu, former deputy governor of Imo state in the 3rd Republic; Dr. Mrs Catherine Acholonu, notable author, researcher, playwright and Senior Special Adviser to President Obasanjo in the 4th Republic; Eze Dr. Patrick II Chinedu Acholonu, Igwe XI, Duru IX of Orlu Gedegwum.

The heroic Samuel Okwaraji who died playing for Nigeria hails from Umudioka Orlu hence the city's main stadium name: Umuowa. The Former Governor of the state, Chief Achike Udenwa, hails from Amaifeke Orlu while the immediate past governor, and current Senator representing Imo West Senatorial District and Chairman House Committee on Culture & Tourism Owelle Rochas Okorocha hails from Ogboko where the Eastern Palm University is located, in the outskirts of the city. Orlu Senatorial Zone has produced the highest number of governors in Imo State.
Johnbull E. Okpara hails from Umuaghobe Isiekenesi, Ideato-South, Johnbull Okpara is the current Controller/Accounting Chief at Citigroup, formal Vice President at American Express (AMEX) and formal Managing Director at Morgan Stanley, New York.
Ada Jesus – Nigerian actress and comedienne
Joseph Chukwudi Obidiaso – footballer
 

Fredrick Ogechi Okwara (born 1989), Nigerian professional footballer

Autonomous communities
Orlu Local Government Area consists of over thirty-three autonomous communities. They include towns like Umuna, Eziachi, Obor, Umuzike, Umutanze, Obinugwu, Umudioka, Amike, Umueze, Umudioka UKWU, Umudioka Ancient kingdom, Mgbee, Oweer-Ebeiri, Alaoma Oweere-Ebeiri,Orlu, Okporo, Amaifeke, Ihioma, Umudioka-Oweere, Umuowa, from there the First Chairman, USA Chapter of the Nigerian ruling party, The Peoples Democratic Party (PDP USA Chapter), Prof. Ikegwuoha, Bernard-Thompson Onyemauchechukwu hail -, Owerre-Ebeiri the home over the longest traditional ruler in the history of Nigeria late Eze Ben Uzomah who was on the throne for over 50 years, Umuowa, Amike, Mgbee, Amaifeke, Ihioma, Okporo, Ogberuru, Obibi-Ochasi, Umuago, Umutanze and Ihitte-Owerre, Orlu is a homeland for Igbo people of Nigeria.

Missionary activities
The Roman Catholic Diocese of Orlu (Latin Dioecesis Orluanus) was erected on November 29, 1980 and houses the Holy Trinity Cathedral, one of the largest cathedrals in west and central Africa. Augustine T. Ukwuoma succeeded Bishop Gregory O. Ochiagha who had served as the Bishop of Orlu since its creation. Orlu is also the location of Nigeria's only parish of the Priestly Fraternity of St. Peter (the Nne Enyemaka Shrine. It also has a diocese of the Anglican communion.
The region also has a number of orthodox and Protestant churches to boost its Christian activities.

Sister cities
Orlu is twinned with:
 Austin, United States

See also
Ishiobiukwu Gedegwum
Catherine Acholonu
Pats Acholonu
HRM Eze Patrick I
Lazarus Olumba

References

External links

 Umuna Town Development Union
 Orlu Town, USA
 Amike Development Union - Orlu, (UK & Ireland Chapter)
 Mgbee Autonomous Community - Orlu LGA
 Towns in Orlu Local Government Area
 Orlu L.G.A List of Towns and Villages Zip Codes

Local Government Areas in Imo State
Cities in Imo State